Avenal (Spanish for "Oat field") is a city in Kings County, California, United States. It is part of the Hanford–Corcoran Metropolitan Statistical Area (MSA Code 25260), which encompasses all of Kings County. In area, it is the fourth largest city in Kings County. The ZIP Code for this community is 93204, and telephone numbers use the sequence (559) 386-XXXX. The population was 15,505 in the 2010 census, which includes inmates at the Avenal State Prison, the first prison actively solicited by a community in the state of California. Many of the remaining residents largely either work at the prison or in the agriculture industry. The prison provides approximately 1,000 jobs to residents. The California Department of Finance estimated that Avenal's population was 13,496 on July 1, 2019. As of that date, Avenal State Prison held 4,165 inmates, which was about 32% of the total population of Avenal. Inmates are counted as city residents by both the United States Census and the California Department of Finance.

Early history
The City of Avenal was named by Spanish soldiers and explorers. In Spanish, "avena" means oats, and "avenal" means oatfield. This area was covered with wild oats, "waist high," that looked like golden silk and covered the Kettleman Plains.

Early American settlers arrived in the Kettleman Hills during the 1850s with dreams of raising cattle and farming. Oil, however, would bring fame, fortune and people to the area. Native Americans had always known oil was in the hills, with natural seepage around Coalinga and Tar Canyon. The first Kettleman Hills well was drilled in 1900, followed by countless unproductive efforts.

On March 27, 1927, the Milham Exploration Company began work on Elliot No. 1. The crew toiled for 19 months, drilling past the  mark.

The discovery of oil transformed Avenal into a boomtown. In 1929, Standard Oil surveyed the current site of Avenal to build a town. Makeshift houses were hauled in from Taft to take the place of the tents. A water line was laid and later a sewer plant was installed, a post office replaced a cigar box in the general store, a fire department was organized and a community grew. Standard Oil Company built the residents a 600-seat theater and a hospital.

Also in the first year (1929), nearly 20 businesses occupied Kings Street and Skyline Boulevard. By 1936, Avenal boasted a population of 3,000 - mostly oil workers - with 100 businesses and 69 private telephones and numerous community organizations. In 1940, Avenal was the second largest town in Kings County with a population of over 4,000 and was known to have some of the best services and schools in the state.

Although today Avenal and its economy are largely reliant on the Avenal State Prison and agriculture, Avenal was once a booming oil town known as the "Oil Fields Capital."

The teeming life of the oil fields, the forward thrust of civilization into the sun-baked hills so recently in their pristine state meant the early development of nearby towns where adequate living facilities could be provided to care for the fast-growing population.

Milham City was projected by a group of Kings County citizens who owned lands on the slope of the hills east of the oil field. It scarcely had emerged from the dream stage when the Standard Oil Company announced in 1929, that a townsite had been set aside on the northwestern slope of the hills and that it would be called Avenal.

Thus the present thriving, interesting little town of Avenal came into being as the "oil capital" of the great field. Roads and streets were surveyed and laid out, water mains were laid, the town was launched on its purposeful career almost overnight.

An emergency hospital was built. Small and large homes were purposefully constructed to enjoy a fuller life in the erstwhile barren plains and trees were planted to provide much needed shade.

On December 5, 1929, the first mail arrived at the new Avenal post office located at Moore's Soda Fountain.

During World War II was the site of a training landing strip called Murray Field, part of Lemoore Army Air Field.

Growth and development
Among the first business establishments at Avenal were Koepp's Welding Works, The Republic Supply Company, Mac's Coffee Shop, Moore's Soda Fountain and the Cross Lumber Company. Presently, the town included 26 oil field supply houses, 12 oil field service company branches, 9 grocery stores, 9 service stations, 8 restaurants, 5 welding establishments, 4 builders' supply houses and numerous other enterprises.

While the oil fields and their urban center were populated with industrious, law-abiding people the problem of keeping the peace and maintaining the dignity of the law existed there just as it does in all other communities where there is life, action and big payrolls. To meet this commonplace problem a township was established and on April 1, 1937, E.W. Oliver was appointed as justice of the peace and William "Bill" Brendal was named constable. Aiding and cooperating with them in the enforcement of the law was Deputy Sheriff Richard "Dick" Doty, who was appointed by Sheriff L.P. Loftis in 1935.

Two other county offices maintained deputies at Avenal for service in the oil fields. They were Orville Robbins, deputy county assessor; and R. W. Zivnuska, deputy county treasurer.

By election in February 1934, the Avenal Township formed a fire district, which served efficiently both in the town and country districts. The three fire district commissioners originally elected were Ray Mohler, Floyd Rice and Jess Hamilton.

The Avenal district owned one well-equipped White fire truck and a half interest with the West Side Fire Protection District, of a 2-ton Reo fire truck. Two full-time drivers were regularly employed and 20 firemen worked call. The firehouse provided living quarters for the employees. Fire Chief L. H. Dell was assisted by M. L. Sperling.

By April 1930, Dr. S. V. Dragoo was the head of the emergency hospital. Dr. Dragoo was assisted by one office worker and two nurses, having two special nurses on call. Between five and six hundred calls per month with about thirty accident cases were handled by this organization, not to mention the ambulance service extended.

Appointed postmistress in November 1931, Mrs. Marie Eads served in that office until July 1933, when she resigned and Charles E. Day was appointed. The post office later occupied a two-story building leased by the Standard Oil Company in 1935. Later in Avenal's history, the Post Office leased a space adjacent to Finster's Market (later T&T Market). In the late 1990s, the post office was relocated to its current location near the intersection of Skyline Blvd and San Joaquin Street.

The collapse of oil and gas production came with the intrusion of salt water into the oil reservoir, leaving 65 to 70 percent of the North Dome of the Kettleman Hills still undisturbed.

In 1953, oil companies with holdings in the area fields named the Standard Oil Company of California to operate the fields. Avenal's economy dwindled and with it, many stores, buildings and houses were vacated until the 1960s when an influx of agricultural workers made a major impact on Avenal and surrounding area.

The early 1970s saw two substantial projects that had significant impacts on the city: the completion of the California Aqueduct which brought in needed water to the westside of the San Jaoquin valley, and the opening of Interstate 5.

The citizens of Avenal voted for incorporation in September 1979, and while going through the early stages of being a new city, the citizens pursued and were successful in bringing a state prison to Avenal. Avenal State Prison opened in 1987. By 2009, it housed 6,577 inmates and employed 1,517 people, making it a vital part of the community. The building of the facility dramatically increased the city's total valuation with construction, improvements and activity that could be seen in every area of the city.

Avenal is also home to the Central California Soaring Club headquartered at the Avenal Gliderport. This year-round operation is one of the few glider-only airports in the western United States, and one of only a few in the entire US that owns/operates its own airport. A soaring contest is held there every spring.

Construction has been completed on the renovation of Skyline Boulevard (California State Route 269) in the city's joint effort with Caltrans.

In November 2010, the Avenal Police Department was initiated with 14 sworn officers.  Jack Amoroso was the first police chief.

Although Avenal's future is no longer closely tied to oil, it will always mark its beginnings from "the day Milham came in," and the cigar box on the counter of the general store which was its first post office.

In 2019, USA Today named Avenal the 10th worst city in America due to high unemployment and violent crime.

Geography
The city boasts at being located, "Half the way from the Bay to L.A."

Most of the population resides in the southwestern portion of the city. The northeastern areas, separated by hills, and where Interstate 5 passes through, remain mostly rural.

Climate
According to the Köppen Climate Classification system, Avenal has a semi-arid climate, abbreviated "BSk" on climate maps.

Demographics

Avenal is a small city of approximately 13,696 people, including prison inmates. Avenal owes its origin to the discovery of oil on 4 October 1928, in the adjacent Kettleman Hills. Avenal was the site of a "tent city" as the boom started, but foresight made the boom orderly, so that by 1940 Avenal was the second largest town in Kings County with a population of 4,600.

Growth continues today to include a more diversified economy based on oil, agriculture, and the service industry. In 1978, Avenal citizens voted to incorporate. The presence of the Avenal State Prison helps this rural community maintain economic stability, especially as the once-productive Kettleman North Dome Oil Field reaches exhaustion (less than one-half of one percent of its original oil remains).

2010
The 2010 United States Census reported that Avenal had a population of 15,505. The racial makeup of Avenal was 6,044 (39.0%) White, 1,625 (10.5%) African American, 186 (1.2%) Native American, 108 (0.7%) Asian, 6 (0.0%) Pacific Islander, 7,188 (46.4%) from other races, and 348 (2.2%) from two or more races. Hispanic or Latino of any race were 11,130 persons (71.8%).

The Census reported that 9,082 people (58.6% of the population) lived in households, 0 (0%) lived in non-institutionalized group quarters, and 6,423 (41.4%) were institutionalized.

There were 2,222 households, out of which 1,437 (64.7%) had children under the age of 18 living in them, 1,236 (55.6%) were opposite-sex married couples living together, 404 (18.2%) had a female householder with no husband present, 236 (10.6%) had a male householder with no wife present. There were 236 (10.6%) unmarried opposite-sex partnerships, and 11 (0.5%) same-sex married couples or partnerships. 229 households (10.3%) were made up of individuals, and 73 (3.3%) had someone living alone who was 65 years of age or older. The average household size was 4.09. There were 1,876 families (84.4% of all households); the average family size was 4.26.

The population was spread out, with 3,315 people (21.4%) under the age of 18, 1,661 people (10.7%) aged 18 to 24, 6,039 people (38.9%) aged 25 to 44, 3,872 people (25.0%) aged 45 to 64, and 618 people (4.0%) who were 65 years of age or older. The median age was 34.2 years. For every 100 females, there were 262.5 males. For every 100 females age 18 and over, there were 357.9 males.

The homeowner vacancy rate was 2.9%; the rental vacancy rate was 5.1%. 4,077 people (26.3% of the population) lived in owner-occupied housing units and 5,005 people (32.3%) lived in rental housing units.

2000
As of the census of 2000, there were 15,689 people, 1,928 households, and 1,640 families residing in the city. The racial makeup of the city was 35.84% White, 12.61% Black or African American, 0.95% Native American, 0.39% Asian, 0.05% Pacific Islander, 47.38% from other races, and 2.79% from two or more races. 65.88% of the population were Hispanic or Latino of any race.

There were 1,928 households, out of which 60.2% had children under the age of 18 living with them, 58.5% were married couples living together, 16.8% had a female householder with no husband present, and 14.9% were non-families. 11.3% of all households were made up of individuals, and 4.7% had someone living alone who was 65 years of age or older. The average household size was 4.14 and the average family size was 4.30.

In the city, the population was spread out, with 21.9% under the age of 18, 13.5% from 18 to 24, 46.5% from 25 to 44, 15.0% from 45 to 64, and 3.3% who were 65 years of age or older. The median age was 31 years. For every 100 females, there were 289.7 males. For every 100 females age 18 and over, there were 403.5 males.

The median income for a household in the city was $29,710, and the median income for a family was $28,019. Males had a median income of $30,802 versus $20,852 for females. The per capita income for the city was $14,090. About 28.3% of families and 30.7% of the population were below the poverty line, including 34.4% of those under age 18 and 5.0% of those age 65 or over.

Economy
Avenal State Prison employs over 1,500 people. Other major employers include The Wonderful Company and the Reef-Sunset Unified School District.

The city has been actively pursuing industrial development and is looking at future development of the Interstate 5 interchange area for both commercial and industrial uses.

In 2008, a 600-megawatt electric power generating plant was proposed to be built and operated in Avenal by Macquarie Cook Power, a subsidiary of the Macquarie Group, doing business as Avenal Power Center, LLC. The project application indicated that the power plant would be fueled with natural gas and that it would be air-cooled. The capital cost of the project would be $530 million. According to the project's proponents, the plant would have generated enough electricity to supply 450,000 homes and businesses annually. The California Energy Commission gave its final approval to the project on December 16, 2009. However, opponents of the power plant vowed to continue to fight. Bradley Angel, Executive Director of Greenaction for Health and Environmental Justice, threatened to file a lawsuit if the United States Environmental Protection Agency (USEPA) approved the project.  Federal approval was delayed, causing the company to sue the USEPA. In February 2011, an EPA official told the U.S. District Court for the District of Columbia that the agency would allow the project to proceed. According to a newspaper story, Bradley Angel commented that Greenaction would continue to fight the project. On May 26, 2011, U.S. District Court Judge Richard Leon ordered the USEPA to make a final permit decision, which the agency did the following day.  Construction of the power plant could begin after a 60-day administrative appeal period. Paul Cort of Earthjustice was quoted in a news story as saying that an administrative appeal would be filed, and if that is unsuccessful, the organization would appeal to the Federal court. In June 2011, both People for Clean Air and Water and the Sierra Club filed petitions for review with the USEPA's environmental appeals board. The Center for Biological Diversity joined the Sierra Club's petition. Their petition alleged that the proposed plant would emit excessive nitrogen oxides and is being wrongfully grandfathered in under old clean air rules. On August 18, 2011, the USEPA's environmental appeals board denied the petition. Bradley Angel renewed his vow to continue the fight in court. A news story quoted him as saying: "Basically the fix was in when EPA boss Lisa Jackson broke her commitment to environmental justice and illegally approved the permit. We're going to continue to challenge it. It's going to court."  On November 3, 2011, The Sierra Club, the Center for Biological Diversity and Greenaction filed suit with the Ninth Circuit Court of Appeals challenging the EPA permit.  On August 12, 2014, the Ninth Circuit Court of Appeals upheld that appeal and rejected the permit, finding that the USEPA had improperly grandfathered the project under the old emissions standards. In June 2015, an attorney representing Avenal Power Center LLC sent a letter to the California Energy Commission stating the company "will let the license expire on Sept. 16, 2015" ending the 7-year long effort to build the power plant.

Many local residents are employed in agriculture, which experienced significant growth on the westside of the San Joaquin Valley after the completion of the California Aqueduct in the early 1970s. However, the community was impacted by the 2008-2012 global recession as well as the California drought and restrictions on pumping from the Sacramento River delta to protect endangered species. In November 2016, the unemployment rate was 12.7%.

In 2013, the City Council self-proclaimed Avenal to be the Pistachio Capital of the World, reflecting the importance of the pistachio industry to the city's economy.

Transportation
Avenal is located at the junction of California State Route 269 and California State Route 33. The intersection of Route 269 and Interstate 5 is located just to the north of Avenal in Fresno County.

Kings Area Regional Transit provides bus service between Avenal and Hanford.

FlixBus services the city, as a stop point in between Los Angeles and the bay area, at the junction of SR 269 and I-5.

Culture
Avenal has an annual celebration held on the first weekend in May called Avenal Old Timers Day. They also celebrate an annual Pistachio Festival.

Government

In the United States House of Representatives, Avenal is in California's 21st District and is represented by Republican David Valadao.

Avenal is represented on the Kings County Board of Supervisors by Richard Valle of Corcoran.

Education
All of the schools in the city of Avenal are within the Reef-Sunset Unified School District (RSUSD) located at 205 N. Park Avenue, Avenal CA, 93204. Dr. David East was appointed Superintendent of the school district in 2010.

The schools in this district are:

 Avenal Elementary School (K-6) Mascot: Wildcats
 Tamarack Elementary School (K-5) Mascot: Tigers
 Reef-Sunset Middle School (6-8) Mascot: Diamondbacks
 Avenal High School (9-12) Mascot: Buccaneers
 Sunrise Continuation School (9-12) Mascot: Eagles
 Adelante Continuation School (9-12) Mascot: Eagles
 Kettleman City Elementary School (K-12) Mascot: Coyotes
 Avenal Adult School (Adults) Mascot: Tortoise

Notable people
 Jose Ramírez, 2012 Boxing Olympian, signed pro with Top Rank.
 J.D. Williams who is a former NFL cornerback
 Paul Williams, who is a wide receiver for the Houston Texans

References

External links

 Avenal Chimes newspaper
 Avenal Health Center
 Avenal State Prison
 Avenal Sand Drags
 Reef-Sunset School District
 Avenal Energy Power Plant Licensing Case, California Energy Commission

Incorporated cities and towns in California
Cities in Kings County, California